Giraldoni is a surname. Notable people with the surname include:

Eugenio Giraldoni (1871–1924), Italian opera singer, son of Leone
Leone Giraldoni (1824–1897), Italian opera singer